For the 1948 Vuelta a España, the field consisted of 54 riders; 26 finished the race.

By rider

By nationality

References

1948 Vuelta a España
1948